The 1978 World Field Archery Championships were held in Geneva, Switzerland.

Medal summary (Men's individual)

Medal summary (Women's individual)

Medal summary (team events)
No team event held at this championships.

References

E
World Archery
World Field Archery Championships
International archery competitions hosted by Switzerland